Obannapalem is a village in Naguluppalapadu Mandal in Prakasam District of Andhra Pradesh State, India. It belongs to Andhra region.

References

Villages in Prakasam district